The 13045/13046 Mayurakshi Express is a daily Intercity Express train belonging to Indian Railways – Eastern Railway zone that runs between  &  via ,  in the Indian state of West Bengal.

It operates as train number 13045 from Howrah to Dumka and as train number 13046 in the reverse direction.

Coach composite 

The train has standard ICF coach with maximum speed of 110 kmph. The rakes are maintained by Eastern Railways. This train consists of 13 coaches that includes,

 10 Unreserved Chair Car
 1 Second Sitting
 2 Luggage cum Parcel Van

Locomotive 

It is hauled by a Howrah Electric Loco Shed-based WAP-4 or WAP-5 locomotive from Howrah to Dumka and vice versa.

Operation 

Mayurakshi Express starts from Dumka daily at 03:45 IST daily and reaches Howrah the same day at 11:35 IST.

Mayurakshi Express starts from Howrah daily at 16:25 IST and reaches Dumka next day at 00:10 IST.

Speed 

Mayurakshi Express has an average speed of 49 kmph and covers 351 km in 7 hours 45 minutes. 13046 has an average speed of 48 kmph and covers 351 km in 7 hours 50 minutes.

Route and halts 

See also 

 Howrah railway station
 Rampurhat Junction railway station
 Andal Junction railway station
 Sainthia Junction railway station
 Siuri railway station

References

External links 

 

Slow and fast passenger trains in India
Rail transport in Howrah
Rail transport in West Bengal
Named passenger trains of India